Poreda is a surname. Notable people with the surname include: 

Aaron Poreda (born 1986), American baseball player
Stanley Poreda (1909–1983), American boxer

See also
Pereda